Viroqua High School is the public high school in Viroqua, Vernon County, Wisconsin as a part of the Viroqua Area School district.

Viroqua High serves about 334 students, grades 9-12, and offers a variety of co-curricular sports and activities that include student council, cheerleading, cross country, football, golf, tennis, volleyball, basketball, gymnastics, hockey, wrestling, baseball, softball, and track and field.

Students at Viroqua High can take Advanced Placement courses and exams. The rate of participation for AP course work is currently 23 percent.

History

Early History

The first school in Viroqua was taught by Mrs. Margaret C. Terhune, in the old log court house building during the latter part of the summer and fall of 1851. The school started two or three weeks after the arrival of W. F. Terhune and his wife. There were about sixteen scholars in attendance. The term lasted about three months and was paid for by subscription at $2 for each scholar. During the succeeding winter of 1851–2 Judge Terhune taught the school at the same place and upon the same plan. Jennie Clark, now Mrs. Messersmith had charge during the following summer.

The old log building continued to be used for school purposes about two years, after which rooms were rented for public schools until 1856, when, the district having been organized, a school house was erected. It stood opposite the present residence of Warren Dunlap. It was, for those days, a commodious frame building, containing two rooms. School was then held in this building. Among the teachers who at different times had charge of the school while this building was in use were: R. C. Bierce, C. M. Butt, L. M. Perham, O. C. Smith, Mr. Moore, T. B. Brown and A. D. Chase. This school house was used for school purposes until 1868, when the present building was erected and the old one was sold to Charles Brown at auction. IIe moved it to a block east of his present place of business, where he used it for a shop for some time and finally sold it to J. H. Tate. It is now used as a dwelling house.

The present building, as stated, was erected in 1868. It is a large stone structure, occupying an excellent site a few blocks east of the main part of town.

The Viroqua high school was organized in 1876. A large brick edifice was erected a little east of the center of town, in 1882, at a cost of

$2,400 for the high and grammar schools. The lower departments occupy the stone building formerly occupied by all the departments. In 1882–3 new furnaces were placed in both buildings and now the schools are heated and ventilated by the latest improved methods. The grounds surrounding the school are extensive and are beautified with different varieties of treeS.

In 1883 the teachers were as follows: High school, C. J. Smith, principal; Lona Washburn, assistant; grammar department, Emma F. Howell, teacher; first intermediate department, Hattie E. Terrell; second intermediate department, Eliza Haughton; first primary department, Ida B. Coe; second primary, Hattie McRie.

Thus it will be seen that the educational facilities of Viroqua are excellent, and the public schools are justly a matter of pride to the citizens.

In 1883 the school board consisted of the following gentleman: Director, R. S. McMichael; clerk, H. A. Chase; treasurer, Earl M. Rogers. The committee upon examination of graduating class was composed of O. B. Wyman, William Haughton and C. J. Smith.

Notable alumni 
 Andrew H. Dahl, member of the Wisconsin State Assembly from 1899 to 1901 and 1903 to 1907. 
 Mark C. Lee, former NASA astronaut who flew on four Space Shuttle missions, graduated in 1970.
 Loren Oldenburg, member of the Wisconsin State Assembly since 2019.
 David Roth, opera director
 Jill Soltau, former CEO of JCPenney.
 Butch Vig, musician, songwriter, and record producer.

References

External links 
 Viroqua High School Website

Schools in Vernon County, Wisconsin
Public high schools in Wisconsin